This is a list of NCAA men's Division I ice hockey tournament Frozen Four appearances by team.

Years in bold indicate the team was the tournament's eventual champions.

Total Frozen Four appearances

The following is a list of National Collegiate Athletic Association (NCAA) Division I college ice hockey teams that have qualified for the NCAA Division I men's ice hockey championship as of 2022, with teams listed by number of appearances.

† = Appearance vacated by the NCAA.

Vacated Frozen Four appearances
1973 - Denver vacated their appearance due to NCAA infractions.
1992 - Wisconsin vacated their appearance due to NCAA infractions.

See also
Frozen Four

References

Frozen Four Appearances By School